Zápara or Záparo may refer to:
 Zápara people, an ethnic group of Ecuador and Peru
 Zápara language, their language

See also 
 Sapara (disambiguation)
 Xaparu River, in Brazil

Language and nationality disambiguation pages